This is an article about the extreme points of Indonesia.

In the context of its geography, the northern extreme is 6°4'30" North and southern is 11°0'27" South. The western extreme point is at 94°58'22" East and the furthest east is at 141°1'10" East.

Each major island has its individual extreme points as well.

Indonesia
Geographic center – Makassar Strait, near Balabalagan Islands 
Northernmost point – Rondo Island, Sukakarya District, Sabang City, Aceh 
Southernmost point – Pamana Island, Southwest Rote District, Rote Ndao Regency, East Nusa Tenggara 
Westernmost point – Benggala Island, Pulo Aceh District, Aceh Besar Regency, Aceh 
Easternmost point – Torasi Estuary, Indonesia-Papua New Guinea border, Merauke Regency, South Papua 
Northernmost settlement – Ie Meulee, Sukajaya District, Sabang City, Aceh 
Southernmost settlement – Bo'a, West Rote District, Rote Ndao Regency, East Nusa Tenggara 
Westernmost settlement – Melingge, Pulo Aceh District, Aceh Besar Regency, Aceh 
Easternmost settlement – Sota, Sota District, Merauke Regency, South Papua 
Lowest point – Southern Philippine Trench, Philippine Sea  
Highest point – Puncak Jaya, Sudirman Range, Mimika Regency, Central Papua

Sumatra
Highest Point – Mount Kerinci, Barisan Mountains, West Sumatra-Jambi border  
Lowest Point – Sunda Trench, Indian Ocean

Including Islands
Northernmost Point – Rondo Island, Sukakarya District, Sabang City, Aceh , north of this lies India's southernmost point Indira Point in Nicobar Islands
Southernmost Point – Rakata, Krakatau Islands, South Lampung Regency, Lampung 
Westernmost Point – Benggala Island, Pulo Air District, Aceh Besar Regency, Aceh 
Easternmost Point – Kepala Island, Natuna Islands, Natuna Regency, Riau Islands

Sumatra only
Northernmost Point – Point Batee, Mesjid Raya District, Aceh Besar Regency, Aceh 
Southernmost Point – Cape Belimbing, Bukit Barisan Selatan National Park, Pesisir Barat Regency, Lampung 
Westernmost Point – Point Raja, Lhoknga SubDistrict, Aceh Besar Regency, Aceh 
Easternmost Point – Cape Kait, Tulung Selapan District, Ogan Komering Ilir Regency, South Sumatra

Java
 Highest Point – Mount Semeru, Bromo Tengger Semeru National Park, Lumajang-Malang Regency border, East Java   
 Lowest Point – Sunda Trench, Indian Ocean

Including Islands
 Northernmost Point – Sebira Island, North Thousand Islands, Thousand Islands Regency, Jakarta 
 Southernmost Point – Cape Bantenan, Blambangan Peninsula, Banyuwangi Regency, East Java 
 Westernmost Point – Cape Baturendeng, Panaitan Island, Pandeglang Regency, Banten 
 Easternmost Point – Sakala Island, Kangean Islands, Sumenep Regency, East Java

Java only
 Northernmost Point – Cape Pujut, Puloampel District, Serang Regency, Banten 
 Southernmost Point – Cape Bantenan, Blambangan Peninsula, Banyuwangi Regency, East Java 
 Westernmost Point – Cape Gede, Ujung Kulon National Park, Pandeglang Regency, Banten 
 Easternmost Point – Cape Slaka, Blambangan Peninsula, Banyuwangi Regency, East Java

Kalimantan
 Highest Point – Bukit Raya, Schwaner Mountains, Katingan Regency, Central Kalimantan  
 Lowest Point – Minahasa Basin, Celebes Sea

Including Islands
 Northernmost Point – Tambalang Hulu Village, Lumbis Ogong District, Nunukan Regency, North Kalimantan-Sabah border 
 Southernmost Point – Kalambau Island, Lesser Laut Islands, Tanah Laut Regency, South Kalimantan 
 Westernmost Point – Dato Island, Segedong District, Mempawah Regency, West Kalimantan 
 Easternmost Point – Sambit Island, Derawan Islands, Berau Regency, East Kalimantan

Kalimantan only
 Northernmost Point – Tambalang Hulu Village, Lumbis Ogong District, Nunukan Regency, North Kalimantan-Sabah border 
 Southernmost Point – Cape South, Panyipatan District, Tanah Laut Regency, South Kalimantan 
 Westernmost Point – Cape Gundul, Sungai Raya Islands District, Bengkayang Regency, West Kalimantan 
 Easternmost Point – Cape Mangkalihat, Sandaran District, East Kutai Regency, East Kalimantan

Lesser Sunda Islands
 Highest Point – Mount Rinjani, Gunung Rinjani National Park, East Lombok Regency, West Nusa Tenggara  
 Lowest Point – Sunda Trench, Eastern Indian Ocean 
 Northernmost Point – Komba Island, Flores Sea, Lembata Regency, East Nusa Tenggara 
 Southernmost Point – Pamana Island, Southwest Rote District, Rote Ndao Regency, East Nusa Tenggara 
 Westernmost Point – Cape Gilimanuk, Melaya District, Jembrana Regency, Bali 
 Easternmost Point – Henes Village, South Lamaknen District, Belu Regency, East Nusa Tenggara-Bobonaro District border

Sulawesi
 Highest Point – Mount Latimojong, Baraka District, Enrekang Regency, South Sulawesi  
 Lowest Point – Southern Philippine Trench, Philippine Sea

Including Islands
 Northernmost Point – Miangas Island, Miangas District, Talaud Islands Regency, North Sulawesi 
 Southernmost Point – Satuko Reef, Central Islands, Pangkajene Islands Regency, South Sulawesi 
 Westernmost Point – Gusung Tandu Reef, Balabalagan Islands, Mamuju Regency, West Sulawesi 
 Easternmost Point – Kakorotan Island, Nanusa District, Talaud Islands Regency, North Sulawesi

Sulawesi only
 Northernmost Point – Cape Tarabitan, West Likupang District, North Minahasa Regency, North Sulawesi 
 Southernmost Point – Tanrusampe Coast, Binamu District, Jeneponto Regency, South Sulawesi 
 Westernmost Point – Point Lumpatang, West Tapalang District, Mamuju Regency, West Sulawesi 
 Easternmost Point – Cape Batuangus, Tangkoko Batuangus Nature Reserve, Bitung City, North Sulawesi

Maluku Islands
 Highest Point – Mount Binaiya, Manusela National Park, Central Maluku Regency, Maluku  
 Lowest Point – Weber Deep, Banda Sea 
 Northernmost Point – Cape Sopi, Morotai, Morotai Island Regency, North Maluku 
 Southernmost Point – Meatimiarang Island, Sermata Islands, Southwest Maluku Regency, Maluku 
 Westernmost Point – Limbo Island, Northwest Taliabu District, Taliabu Island Regency, North Maluku 
 Easternmost Point – Penambulai Island, South Central Aru District, Aru Islands Regency, Maluku

Papua (Western New Guinea)
 Highest Point – Puncak Jaya, Sudirman Range, Mimika Regency, Central Papua  
 Lowest Point – Ayu Trough, Western Pacific Ocean

Including Islands
 Northernmost Point – Fani Island, Raja Ampat Regency, West Papua 
 Southernmost Point – Kondo Coast, Naukenjerai District, Merauke Regency, South Papua 
 Westernmost Point – Greater Boo Island, Kofiau District, Raja Ampat Regency, West Papua 
 Easternmost Point – Torasi Estuary, Indonesia-Papua New Guinea border, Merauke Regency, South Papua

Papua only
 Northernmost Point – Cape Yamursba, Abun District, Tambrauw Regency, West Papua 
 Southernmost Point – Kondo Coast, Naukenjerai District, Merauke Regency, South Papua 
 Westernmost Point – Cape Sele, Seget District, Sorong Regency, West Papua 
 Easternmost Point – Torasi Estuary, Indonesia-Papua New Guinea border, Merauke Regency, South Papua

See also
Extreme points of Earth

References

Geography of Indonesia
Headlands of Indonesia
Indonesia
Lists of landforms of Indonesia